Christophe Ruer (3 July 1965 – 27 July 2007) was a French modern pentathlete. He competed at the 1988, 1992 and 1996 Summer Olympics. He was killed in a motorcycle accident.

References

External links
 

1965 births
2007 deaths
French male modern pentathletes
Olympic modern pentathletes of France
Modern pentathletes at the 1988 Summer Olympics
Modern pentathletes at the 1992 Summer Olympics
Modern pentathletes at the 1996 Summer Olympics
Sportspeople from Nantes
Motorcycle road incident deaths
Road incident deaths in France